Charlotte Robin (born 1985) is a swimmer and triathlete who represents New Caledonia. In July 2019, she won the first gold medal of the 2019 Pacific Games, winning the women's 5km open water race.

References

External links
 

1985 births
Living people
New Caledonian female swimmers
Place of birth missing (living people)